Ethephon is a plant growth regulator.

Mechanism of action
Upon metabolism by the plant, it is converted into ethylene, a potent regulator of plant growth and ripeness. It is also a butyrylcholinesterase inhibitor.

Uses in various crops 

Ethephon often used on wheat, coffee, tobacco, cotton, and rice in order to help the plant's fruit reach ripeness more quickly.

Cotton is the most important single crop use for ethephon. It initiates fruiting over a period of several weeks, promotes early concentrated boll opening, and enhances defoliation to facilitate and improve efficiency of scheduled harvesting. Harvested cotton quality is improved.

Ethephon also is widely used by pineapple growers to initiate reproductive development (force) of pineapple. Ethephon is also sprayed on mature-green pineapple fruits to degreen them to meet produce marketing requirements. There can be some detrimental effect on fruit quality.

The toxicity of ethephon is very low, and any ethephon used on the plant is converted very quickly to ethylene.

The use of this chemical is allowed in the European Union.

References

Phosphonic acids
Organochlorides
Chloroethyl compounds